Charles S. McCullough House, also known as the Memorial Center, is a historic home located at Darlington, Darlington County, South Carolina.  It was built in 1889, and is a -story, brick Second Empire style residence.  It has a projecting one-story ell and a porch on three sides. The front porch has elaborate sawn brackets on paired turned posts and an ornamental balustrade. The front elevation features a steeply pitched gable,  which rises above the top of the mansard roof.

It was listed on the National Register of Historic Places in 1988.

References

Houses on the National Register of Historic Places in South Carolina
Second Empire architecture in South Carolina
Houses completed in 1889
Houses in Darlington County, South Carolina
National Register of Historic Places in Darlington County, South Carolina
Darlington, South Carolina